David or Dave Osborne may refer to:

 David Osborne (politician) (born 1964), American politician; Republican member of the Kentucky House of Representatives
 David E. Osborne (born 1951), American author and former Al Gore advisor
 David Osborne (cricketer) (1879–1954), English cricketer
 Super Dave Osborne, a character created and played by comedian Bob Einstein

See also 
 David L. Osborn, American diplomat
 Dave Osborn, American football player
 
 David Osbourne, a character on the Irish soap opera Fair City, portrayed by Matt Fraser